Located Clarksville in Howard County, Maryland, United States, Huntington Farms.

Huntington Farms is a two-story L-shaped brick house started in 1840 by John T. Hardey. Hardey's brother Dr. William H. Hardey, built Montrose next door in 1844. The house was built during the antebellum slavery period in the Howard District of Anne Arundel County, which later became Howard County. In 1875, the house was destroyed in a fire and rebuilt in its current configuration. The property contains remnants of a brick kiln that was used by slaves to fire bricks, and a graveyard that contains family and slaves. The graveyard containing Nicholas Hardy, buried in 1850 is now located between two pipe-stem driveways in the subdivision.

The surrounding farmland has been reduced from 185 acres to 13 acres in 1977 and subdivided to only 3.085 acres around the original house for residential development.

See also
List of Howard County properties in the Maryland Historical Trust
Montrose (Clarksville, Maryland)

References

Houses in Howard County, Maryland
Plantation houses in Maryland